The Tainan Judicial Museum or Old Tainan District Court is a museum in West Central District, Tainan, Taiwan.

History
The museum building was originally constructed as a courthouse in 1914 during the Japanese rule of Taiwan under the direct jurisdiction of the Governor-General of Taiwan. After the handover of Taiwan from Japan to the Republic of China in 1945, the building underwent several renovations. The western part of the building later on collapsed and was demolished in 1969. In 1991 after the National Historical Monument Conference, the building was designated as a second class historical monument by the Ministry of the Interior. In 2003, the building underwent renovation work. It was then completed on 8 November 2016 in a ceremony attended by Judicial Yuan President Hsu Tzong-li.

Architecture
The original court building was designed by Japanese architect  with the Baroque architecture style. It has gable-style asymmetrical porch. Its facade consists of 8 portions,
in which each has its own oeil-de-boeuf window.

Exhibition
The museum exhibits the history of the building, law-related writings, changes around the district, historical documents on law, uniqueness of the architect, exhibition on the restoration works, photographs etc.

Transportation
The museum is accessible within walking distance southwest of Tainan Station of Taiwan Railways.

See also
 List of museums in Taiwan

References

External links

 

1914 establishments in Taiwan
Baroque architecture in Taiwan
Buildings and structures completed in 1914
Former courthouses
Museums in Tainan
Law museums in Asia